Port Stewart is a town in the Shire of Cook, Queensland, Australia. The town is within the locality of Coen.

Geography 
The town is adjacent to the Stewart River. There are only a few buildings in the town.

References

External links 
 

Shire of Cook
Towns in Queensland